Below is a list of tanks and other armoured fighting vehicles of the Russian empire, Soviet Union, the Russian Federation, and Ukraine.

Imperial Russia, World War I

Armored tractors
Gulkevich's armored tractor
F. Blinov armored tractor
Walter armored vehicle

Tanks
Vezdekhod
Vezdekhod No.2
Tsar tank
Mendeleev Tank (project)
Rybinsk tank
Earth Battleship (Земной броненосец) - project

Self-propelled guns
Drizhenko self-propelled gun
Turtle (Navrotsky Self-propelled gun)

After World War I to early World War II (1918-1940)

Armored cars 

 FAI
 FAI-2
Broneavtomobil-series armored cars:
 BA-I 
 BA-3
 BA-5
 BA-6
 BA-6S - half-tracked version of BA-6
 BA-9
 BA-10
 BA-11
 BA-20 
 BA-21
 BA-23
 BA-27
 BA-30
 BAD-1
 BAD-2
 BDT
 BKhM-1000/800
 D-8 Armored Car
 D-9
 D-12
 D-13
 D-18/37
 DSh
 DTR
 FVV
 GAZ-TK
 KS-18
 PB-4
 PB-7
 Matval

Tankettes

T-17 -3 built
T-21
T-23 - 5 built
T-27 based on the Carden Loyd tankette
D-7
D-44
Shchitonoska
Fordzon

Amphibious light tanks

T-37
T-38
T-40
T-41
T-33
T-43-2
PT-1

Light tanks

"Freedom Fighter Lenin"  - locally built copy of the Renault FT
T-18 (MS-1)
T-19
T-25 (STZ-25)
T-26
T-26-5
T-34
T-46
T-51
BT-2
BT-5
RBT-5 - BT-5 variant with torpedo rockets
BT-6
BT-7
BT-7A - BT-7 armed with 76mm KT-28 gun
BT-7M, or BT-8
BT-203
BT-SV, or BT-SW-2
BT-Tsyganova - a "very fast" version of the BT-7 by N. F. Tsyganova
Teletank (TT)
A-20
STZ-35
D-38
TM tank
0-10
Teplokhod AN
D-10
D-11
TMM
LTTB

Medium tanks

T-12
T-24
Tank Grotte (TG-1) (experimental)
T-28
T-29 (experimental)
A-32 (T-34 prototype)
T-34
T-43
GUBP
TA-1
TA-2
D-4
D-5
IT-3
Object 112
Object 115

Heavy tanks

T-35
T-39
SMK (Experimental)
T-100 tank (Experimental)
KV-0 (Prototype for KV-1)
T-30
TP-1
TA-3
Sirkena tank project
Danchenko tank project
Object 0-50
Object 103
T-100-Z
IS
VL (project)
TG-V
TG-VI

Tank destroyers and SPGs

4M
29K
AT-1
SU-1
SU-2
SU-3
SU-4
SU-5
SU-6
SU-7
SU-8
SU-12
SU-14
SU-14-1
SU-14-2
SU-18
SU-26
SU-37
SU-45
T-26-4

Flame-throwing tanks

KhT-26
OT-27/KhT-27
MKhT-1
OT-37/KhT-37
KhT-130
KhT-133
KhT-134
OT-132
OT-7
D-15
OU-T-26
Object 218

Other vehicles
Antonov A-40 - (Krylya Tanka) single prototype "flying tank"
Hovercraft tank
STZ-5

World War II (1941-1945)
The list does not include all vehicles, as there were many more experimental, or otherwise rare vehicles.

Armored cars

BA-64
LB-23
LB-62
LB-NATI

Tankettes

PPG tankette
NI tank (Odessa tank)

Light tanks

T-40
T-50
T-60
T-70
T-80 (prototype light tank)
T-111
T-116
T-126 (SP) - up-armored version of T-50
T-127
LTP
MT-25 (proposal tank)
LTTB (design only)

Medium tanks
T-28
T-34
T-34-57
T-34-76
T-34-85
T-34-100
T-34M (also known as the A-43) (not serially produced)
T-43 tank (not serially produced)
T-44
KV-13 - a KV "universal" tank
 A-44

Heavy tanks

T-150
Kliment Voroshilov tanks:
KV-1
KV-2
KV-1S
KV-85 (stopgap) - 135 produced 
KV-220 (Experimental) 
KV-8 (Flamethrower)
KV-8S (Flamethrower)
KV-122 (Prototype)
KV-3 (proposed heavy tank)
KV-4
KV-5 (proposed heavy tank)
IS tank family tanks:
IS-1 
IS-2
IS-3

Tank destroyers and assault guns

AT-1 - "Artillery tank" variant of T-26, prototypes only
SG-122
SU-57B
SU-76
SU-85
SU-85A
SU-100
SU-100Y - prototype self-propelled gun
SU-100S 
SU-100M1
SU-100M2
Uralmash-1 (SU-101) - prototypes only
SU-122
SU-122P
SU-122-44 - unbuilt project
SU-152
ISU-122
ISU-122S
ISU-130
ISU-152
Object 704
KV-7 -  Experimental self-propelled gun
U-18
U-34
U-35
ZiK-20

Self-propelled guns

ZiS-30
SU-100Y
Object 212A
S-51

Self-propelled anti-air
T-90 (Experimental)
ZUT-37 (Experimental)
ZSU-37

Lend-Lease tanks
Tetrarch 
Valentine Tank
Churchill Tank
Matilda II
M3 Stuart
M3 Lee
M4 Sherman
M10 Wolverine

Captured tanks
This includes modified captured tanks.

T-III (T-3) - captured Panzer III
T-V (T-5) - captured Panther tank
SU-76i - captured Panzer III modified to mount an 76mm S-1 gun on a tank destroyer configuration.
SU-85i - captured Panzer III modified to mount an 85mm D-5S-85A gun on a tank destroyer configuration.

After World War II (Soviet era, continued)

Armored fighting vehicles (AFVs)
BMP-1
BMP-2
BMP-3
BMD-1
BMD-2
BMD-3
BMO-1
BTR-series AFVs:
BTR-D
BTR-40
BTR-50
BTR-60
BTR-70
BTR-80
BTR-112 (Object 112)
BTR-152
BTR-E152V
BRDM-1
BRDM-2
Object 19
Object 659
Object 680
Object 681
Object 688
Object 768
Object 769
Object 911
Object 914
Object 955
Object 1015
Object 1200
GAZ-50
K-75
K-78
GT-L
GT-LB
GT-MU
MT-LB
MT-LBu
obj910

Light tanks

T-100 light tank
PT-76
Object 685
Object 788
Object 906
Object 911B
Object 934
R-39 (Object 101)

Medium and main battle tanks
T-54/T-55
T-62
T-64
T-72
T-74
T-80
Object 140
Object 142
Object 167
Object 172
Object 172-2M "Buyvol"
Object 187
Object 292
Object 416
Object 430
Object 432
Object 435
Object 476
Object 477 "Molot"
Object 478
Object 490
Object 490A
Object 785
Object 907
Object 920

Heavy tanks
IS-4
IS-6 (Experimental)
IS-7 (Experimental)
T-10 (IS-10)
T-10M (1957–1994)
Object 266
Object 267
Object 269
Object 277
Object 278
Object 279 (Experimental)
Object 705
Object 706
Object 726
Object 770

Tank destroyers and assault guns
Object 263 (Cancelled in design phase)
Object 268 (Experimental)
SU-100P
SU-152P
SU-152G
Object 120 SU-152 "Taran" (Experimental)
SU-122-54
K-73
ASU-57
ASU-76
ASU-85
BSU-11-57F
2S14 Zhalo-S
2S15 Norov
Germes
Object 574

Self-propelled guns
 Object 261
 Object 327
 2A3 Kondensator 2P
 2S1 Gvozdika
 2S2 Fialka
 2S3 Akatsiya
 2S4 Tyulpan
 2S5 Giatsint-S
 2S7 Pion
 2S8 Astra
 2S9 Nona
 2S11 Giatsint-SK
 2S17-2 Nona-SV
 2S18 Pat-S
 2S19 Msta
 2S21 Msta-K
 2S22 Kolba-Z
 2S23 Nona-SVK
 2S24 Deva
 2S27 Rif
 2S30 Iset
 2S31 Vena
 2B1 Oka
 Otsek
 Obzhimka

Self-propelled anti-air
ZSU-57-2
ZSU-23-4 (Shilka)
ZSU-37-2 Yenisei
9K35 Strela-10
9K31 Strela-1
9K33 Osa
2K12 Kub
2K11 Krug
2K22 (Tunguska)
Object 130
Object 530
ZTPU-2
ZPRK Roman

Tanks and AFVs with ATGMs
IT-1
Object 170
Object 282
Object 286
Object 431
Object 287
Object 747
Object 757
Object 772
Object 775
Object 778
Object 780
Object 906B
Object 920
2P27 Shmel'
2P32 Falanga
9P19 Glaz
9P110 Obod
9P122
9P124
9P133
9P137 Fleyta
9P148 Konkurs
9P149 Shturm-S

Rocket launchers
TOS-1
BM-24T
Object 280

Flame-throwing tanks
OT-54
TO-55
Object 483

Laser tanks
1K11 Stilet
1K17 Szhatie
SLK Sangvin

Other vehicles and AFVs
SPU-117 (Object 117)
Object 288
Progvev-T

Post-Soviet Vehicles

Armored fighting vehicles (AFVs)
T-15 IFV (Russia)
BMD-4 (Russia)
BTR-90 (Russia)
BMPT Terminator (Russia)
Kamaz Typhoon (Russia)
GAZ Tigr (Russia)

Light tanks

2S25 Sprut-SD (Russia)

Medium and main battle tanks

T-84 (Ukraine)
T-90 (Russia)
Black Eagle (Russia)
T-95  (Russia)
T-14 Armata (Russia)
BM Oplot (Ukraine)
T-55-64 "Frankenstein" tank (T-55 turret on T-64 hull) (Ukraine)

Self-propelled guns

2S19 Msta-S (Russia)
2S35 Koalitsiya-SV  (Russia)
2S42 Lotus (Russia)

Notes

References 
 
Milsom, John (1971). Russian Tanks, 1900–1970: The Complete Illustrated History of Soviet Armoured Theory and Design, Harrisburg Penn.: Stackpole Books. .
 Zaloga, Steven J., James Grandsen (1984). Soviet Tanks and Combat Vehicles of World War Two, London: Arms and Armour Press. .

See also
 Tanks in the Soviet Union
List of armoured fighting vehicles of Ukraine
List of Soviet tank factories

 
Soviet tanks
Tan